Qi Yuhong (born August 25, 1989) is a Chinese competitive archer. She won a bronze medal as a member of the Chinese women's archery team at the 2015 Asian Championships in Bangkok, Thailand, and eventually finished as one of the top 16 finalists in the individual recurve tournament at the 2016 Summer Olympics.

Qi was selected to compete for the Chinese squad at the 2016 Summer Olympics in Rio de Janeiro, shooting in both individual and team recurve tournaments. She opened the tournament by discharging 649 points, 20 perfect tens, and 5 bull's eyes to seal the eleventh seed heading to the knockout draw from the classification round, along with her trio's cumulative score of 1,933. In the women's team recurve, Qi and her younger compatriots Cao Hui and Wu Jiaxin directly advanced to the quarterfinals as the third-seeded squad, but they were eliminated early by the Italian women in a shocking 3–5 match. In the women's individual recurve, Qi bounced back from the trio's quarterfinal exit to reach the top sixteen round by disposing Brazil's home favorite Marina Canetta (7–1) and Slovakia's Alexandra Longová. However, she narrowly missed the quarterfinal match in a tough 6–5 shoot-off from her younger teammate Wu.

References

External links
 

Chinese female archers
Living people
Sportspeople from Shanghai
1989 births
Olympic archers of China
Archers at the 2016 Summer Olympics